The 1911 All-Ireland Senior Football Championship was the 25th staging of Ireland's premier Gaelic football knock-out competition. In the Leinster Quarter final Dublin ended Louth's period as All Ireland champions. Cork were the winners, beating Antrim, the first Ulster team to make the final.

Results

Connacht Senior Football Championship

Leinster Senior Football Championship

Munster Senior Football Championship

Ulster Senior Football Championship

All-Ireland Senior Football Championship

Championship statistics

Miscellaneous
 Cork win their second All Ireland title first since 1890.
 Antrim play in their first ever All Ireland final.

References